BHG Financial, LLC (originally known as Bankers Healthcare Group) is an American company that provides financial lending services, debt collection services, risk and regulatory management services and private equity & venture capital valuation processes.

History
The company was co-founded in 2001 as Bankers Healthcare Group, Inc. under the leadership of co-founding partners Bobby Castro, Eric Castro and Al Crawford.

Headquartered the South Florida, Broward County in the town of Davie, Florida, Bankers Healthcare Group, LLC also has office locations in Syracuse, New York and Midtown Manhattan, New York City.

In February 2015, Pinnacle Financial Partners, acquired a 30 percent interest in BHG for $75 million. In February 2016, Pinnacle purchased an additional 19% of BHG for $144 million worth of cash and stock.

Since 2005, BHG has been ranked on the Inc 5000 list over ten times. In 2016, BHG's Davie location was named the best place to work by the South Florida Business Journal. In March 2017, BHG ranked #9 on Fortune’s 40 best companies in financial services.

In April 2022, the company officially changed its name from Bankers Healthcare Group to BHG Financial.

Services 
BHG Financial is a direct lender that provides financing to licensed healthcare professionals such as physicians, dentists and veterinarians.

In 2011, the company introduced a credit card option to support healthcare professionals.

In 2015, BHG launched a sister company, BHG Insurance Services, to provide personal and commercial insurance coverage to healthcare professionals.

BHG Financial currently operates six subsidiary financial brands, BHG Money for loans and credit cards, BHG Bank Network for bank loan deliveries, NaluPay for point-of-sale financing, Fund-Ex Solutions Group for small business funding, Risk Management Solutions Group for risk management, and consumer lending platform BHG Connect.

Founders
Eric Castro was born in the Bronx, New York. He met Al Crawford and joined forces to form Bankers Healthcare Group (BHG).

References

Financial services companies established in 2001
Financial services companies based in Florida
Companies based in Syracuse, New York
Financial services companies based in New York (state)